Ardee is a ghost town in Stewart County, in the U.S. state of Tennessee.

History
The community was perhaps named after Ardee, in Ireland.

References

Geography of Stewart County, Tennessee